The Christian Democrats (Danish: Kristendemokraterne) (KD) are a political party in Denmark. The party was founded in April 1970 as the Christian People's Party (Kristeligt Folkeparti) to oppose the liberalization of restrictions on pornography and the legalization of abortion. The party renamed itself to its current name in 2003. Originally, the party was not considered part of the European Christian-democratic tradition, and it was better known as a religious conservative party.

The Christian Democrats are a member of the European People's Party (EPP) and the Centrist Democrat International.

History
The party was formed in 1970. Since its inception, the party has enjoyed an intermittent presence in the Parliament of Denmark, rarely winning much more than the two percent minimum required to gain seats under Denmark's proportional representation system, and frequently falling below the threshold, as has happened in every election from the 2005 parliamentary election onwards. Despite its small size, the party has served in a number of coalition governments. From 1982 to 1988, it was in coalition with the Liberal Party, Conservative People's Party and Centre Democrats; from 1993 to 1994, it served in government with the Social Democrats, the Social Liberals and the Centre Democrats.

From 2002 to 2005, the party was led by Marianne Karlsmose. The name of the party was changed to the Christian Democrats in 2003. In October 2005, the party elected Bodil Kornbek as its new chairman. Her attempt to introduce a more secular centre-left profile had some success in the beginning, but the party once again failed to win seats in the 2007 elections. In October 2008, Kornbek was replaced by Bjarne Hartung Kirkegaard from its more conservative and religious wing.

In 2010, the Christian Democrats regained parliamentary representation when the Independent former Conservative MP Per Ørum Jørgensen joined the party. Since he was not formerly known for having expressed opinions based on Christianity, these events once more softened the religious character of the party.

On 30 June 2011, it was announced that the Christian Democrats had started cooperating with Fælleslisten, a single-issue party fighting for decentralization, especially in health care policy, with some success in regional and local elections. This means that candidates from the two parties appeared on a joint list at the 2011 Danish parliamentary election. The Christian Democrats had themselves taken a somewhat regionalist stance at a moment when Fælleslisten had surged in opinion polls.

In September 2012, Per Ørum Jørgensen resigned and subsequently left the party altogether in order to form a new party called the Democratic Party. Egon Jakobsen was appointed as interim chairman, and on 27 October 2012, the former deputy chairman Stig Grenov was elected as new chairman.

Christian Democratic Politicians

Party chairmen
 Jacob Christensen: 1970–1973
 Jens Møller: 1973–1979
 Flemming Kofod-Svendsen: 1979–1990
 Jann Sjursen: 1990–2002
 Marianne Karlsmose: 2002–2005
 Bodil Kornbek: 2005–2008
 Bjarne Hartung Kirkegaard: 2008–2011
 Per Ørum Jørgensen: 2011–2012
 Egon Jakobsen: 2012 (a.i.)
 Stig Grenov: 2012–2019
 Isabella Arendt: 2019–2022
 Marianne Karlsmose: 2022
 Henrik Hjortshøj & Jesper Housgaard: 2022–2023 (a.i.)
 Jeppe Hedaa: 2023–

Ministers
 Christian Christensen: Minister for the Environment and Nordic Cooperation (1982–88).
 Flemming Kofod-Svendsen: Minister for Housing (1987–88). Minister for Housing, Nordic Cooperation and Baltic Sea Questions (1993–1994).
 Jann Sjursen: Minister of Energy (1993–1994).

Election results

Parliament

Local elections

European Parliament

Further reading

Notes

References

External links 
  in Danish

Christian democratic parties in Europe
Protestant political parties
Political parties in Denmark
Political parties established in 1970
Member parties of the European People's Party
1970 establishments in Denmark
Centrist parties in Denmark
Regionalist parties